Kříž (feminine Křížová) is a Czech surname, meaning "cross". It may refer to:
 Denisa Křížová, Czech ice hockey player
 František Kříž, Czech fencer
 Jaroslav Kříž, Czech judoka
 Jiřina Křížová, Czech field hockey player
 Klára Křížová, Czech skier
 Ladislav Kříž, Czech athlete
 Martin Kříž, Czech basketball player
 Miloslav Kříž, Czech basketball player
 Tomáš Kříž, Czech footballer

Czech-language surnames